Miss Teen USA 2013 was the 31st Miss Teen USA pageant, held on August 10, 2013 at Atlantis Paradise Island, Nassau, Bahamas and was hosted by Australian journalist Karl Jeno Schmid and Miss Teen USA 2003 Tami Farrell. Logan West of Connecticut crowned her successor Cassidy Wolf of California at the end of the event. The 50 states and the District of Columbia competed for the title and the pageant was webcast on the official Miss Teen USA website via Ustream and on Xbox Live.

Results

Placements

‡ Voted into Top 16 as America's Choice via Internet/SMS Messaging

Special Awards

Historical significance 
 California wins competition for the second time.
 South Carolina earns the 1st runner-up position for the second time. The last time it was placed in 2008.
 West Virginia earns the 2nd runner-up position for the second time. The last time it was placed in 2005.
 Georgia earns the 3rd runner-up position for the second time. The last time it was placed in 1983.
 Minnesota earns the 4th runner-up position for the first time.
 States that placed in semifinals the previous year were Alabama, Georgia, Hawaii, Kansas, New York, South Carolina and West Virginia.
 Georgia, Kansas, South Carolina and West Virginia placed for the third consecutive year. 
 Alabama, Hawaii and New York made their second consecutive placement.
 California, Maryland, Minnesota, Missouri and New Jersey last placed in 2011.
 Arkansas and Tennessee last placed in 2010.
 Louisiana last placed in 2009.
 Wisconsin last placed in 2002.

Events

Fan vote
Fans can vote for a delegate to reach the semifinals (Top 16) July 15-August 9. The fan vote was won by Missouri Brenda Smith-Lezama.

Preliminary competition (Ustream)
A preliminary round was conducted on August 9, a day before the finals.

Finals (Ustream & Xbox Live)
The Top 16 was announced during the Final Show and they competed in the Swimsuit and Evening Gown rounds. After the Evening Gown competition, the girls were interviewed backstage by Karl Schmid, sending the show to an intermission. The Top 5 were announced and asked questions about themselves. Then the judges asked questions prepared for them. Each finalist were allowed 30 seconds to answer the question. The judges took one last look at the Top 5 Finalists and Logan West takes her final walk as Miss Teen USA before crowning her successor, Cassidy Wolf.

Judges
Butch Beard
Lisa Carvalho
Denise Garrido - Miss World Canada 2010.
Chuck Labella
Fred Nelson

Delegates

Historical significance
This is the second Miss Teen USA win for California

Availability
While the webcast will be available worldwide via the Miss Teen USA website, Xbox Live's broadcast of the pageant will only be available in the following countries:

References

http://m.beautypageantnews.com/olivia-argue-miss-arizona-teen-usa-2013/
https://web.archive.org/web/20130301034308/http://www.sex.com/news/blog/2013/02/26/miss-delaware-teen-usa-melissa-king-sex-video/

External links
 Miss Teen USA official website
 

2013
2013 in the United States
2013 beauty pageants
2013 in the Bahamas